Haslach an der Mühl is a municipality in the district of Rohrbach in the Austrian state of Upper Austria.

Geography
Haslach lies in the upper Mühlviertel. About 33 percent of the municipality is forest, and 57 percent is farmland.

References

Cities and towns in Rohrbach District